This is a list of sports events in Central America countries, showing the companies holding broadcasting rights under contract. Companies with rights to a wide range of sports include Fox Sports and ESPN.

Yachting
ESPN: America's Cup, America's Cup Qualifiers and Challenger Playoffs and America's Cup World Series

Association football

European tournaments

Latin American tournaments

Other leagues and tournaments

Basketball

Combat sports 
King of Kings: DAZN: October 2022 to October 2025, all fights
Bushido MMA: DAZN: October 2022 to October 2025, all fights
Dream Boxing: DAZN: October 2022 to October 2025, all fights

References

Latin American media
 Latin America
Latin America-related lists